Momchil Nekov is a Bulgarian politician, who, in period 2014 — 2019, was a Member of the European Parliament, representing Bulgaria. He is a member of the Bulgarian Socialist Party. Deputy Minister of Agriculture in the government of Kiril Petkov.

Parliamentary service
Member, Committee on Culture and Education
Member, Delegation for relations with the People's Republic of China

References

Living people
1986 births
MEPs for Bulgaria 2014–2019
People from Silistra
Bulgarian Socialist Party politicians